Hakim Zouari (born 28 March 1988) is a Tunisian volleyball player. He competed in the men's tournament at the 2012 Summer Olympics.

References

1988 births
Living people
Tunisian men's volleyball players
Olympic volleyball players of Tunisia
Volleyball players at the 2012 Summer Olympics
People from Sfax
Mediterranean Games silver medalists for Tunisia
Mediterranean Games medalists in volleyball
Competitors at the 2013 Mediterranean Games